Csővár is a village in Pest county, Hungary. Its name comes from the Hungarian words cső (tube) and vár (tower).

References

Populated places in Pest County